The 1998–99 St. Francis Terriers men's basketball team represented St. Francis College during the 1998–99 NCAA Division I men's basketball season. The team was coached by Ron Ganulin, who was in his eighth year at the helm of the St. Francis Terriers. The Terrier's home games were played at the  Generoso Pope Athletic Complex. The team has been a member of the Northeast Conference since 1981.

The Terriers finished the season at 20–8 overall and 16–4 in conference play. Their twenty wins marks the first time in 43 years that the Terriers had accomplished the feat. At the end of the season Ray Minlend was named the NEC Player of the Year, he was the second Terrier to accomplish the feat after Robert Jackson (1984). Minlend also set the Terrier record for points in a season, 690, and points per game, 24.3. During the season Minlend finished 2nd in the NCAA for points per game behind Niagara's Alvin Young (25.1).

Roster

Schedule and results

|-
!colspan=12 style="background:#0038A8; border: 2px solid #CE1126;;color:#FFFFFF;"| Regular season

|-
!colspan=12 style="background:#0038A8; border: 2px solid #CE1126;;color:#FFFFFF;"| 1999 NEC tournament

References

St. Francis Brooklyn Terriers men's basketball seasons
St. Francis
St. Francis
St. Francis